Nucleolar protein 6 is a protein that in humans is encoded by the NOL6 gene.

The nucleolus is a dense subnuclear membraneless organelle that assembles around clusters of rRNA genes and functions in ribosome biogenesis. This gene encodes a nucleolar RNA-associated protein that is highly conserved between species. RNase treatment of permeabilized cells indicates that the nucleolar localization is RNA dependent. Further studies suggest that the protein is associated with ribosome biogenesis through an interaction with pre-rRNA primary transcripts. Alternative splicing has been observed at this locus and two splice variants encoding distinct isoforms have been identified.

References

Further reading